American Society for Aesthetics (ASA) is a philosophical organization founded in 1942 to promote the study of aesthetics.  The ASA sponsors national and regional conferences, and publishes the Journal of Aesthetics and Art Criticism, the American Society for Aesthetics Graduate Ejournal, and the ASA Newsletter. The organization also funds various projects.

Awards
 biennial John Fisher Memorial Prize in Aesthetics to an original essay in aesthetics
 Monograph Prize for an outstanding monograph in the philosophy of art or aesthetics
 Ted Cohen Prize (to honor Ted Cohen), founded in 2014

External links 
American Society for Aesthetics Records at San Diego University
 American Council of Learned Societies ASA Profile
 Aesthetics Online

Aesthetics organizations
Philosophical societies in the United States
1942 establishments in the United States
Organizations established in 1942
American philosophy